Zeugomantispa minuta, the green mantisfly, is a species of mantidfly in the family Mantispidae. It is found in the Caribbean Sea, Central America, North America, and South America.

References

Further reading

External links

 

Hemerobiiformia
Articles created by Qbugbot
Insects described in 1775
Taxa named by Johan Christian Fabricius